The International World Games Association, abbreviated as IWGA, is an international association, recognised by the International Olympic Committee (IOC), that organises every four years, beginning in 1981, the multi-sport event called The World Games.

History 
The IWGA was founded on 21 May 1980 in Seoul, South Korea, as World Games Council by 12 international sports federations with a worldwide reach that were not yet part of the Olympic Games. The intention was to increase the popularity of the sports represented by these federations. The IWGA was constituted under Swiss law as a non-governmental and non-profit-making organisation.

In 1984, the World Games Council was renamed as the International World Games Association. Since its creation, the number of member federations has increased to 39 with the most recent admissions being the International Sambo Federation and International Wushu Federation in May 2021.

Structure 
The highest body of the IWGA is the General Meeting. It is chaired by the President. It is composed of representatives from Member Federations, with one vote per federation. General Meetings can be held whenever deemed necessary, but one must be held each year as the Annual General Meeting (AGM). Among other rights, the General Meeting has the power to:

 Approve and amend the Constitution
 Ratify the selection of the Host City of The World Games
 Ratify the selection of the sports, or disciplines of sports, of The World Games
 Establish Committees

Membership 
Federations that intend to become a full member of the IWGA must be part of the Association of IOC Recognised International Sports Federations (ARISF). Since 2014, IOC recognition has become a prerequisite for International Federations to become a Member of the IWGA.  Sports that want to be recognised by the IWGA need to have a worldwide significance but actually must not be in the programme of the Olympic Games.

Affiliate status 
Since 2020, Affiliate Status was introduced for full Members of ASOIF and AIOWF.  

Affiliate status is temporary, and only open to those Federations that are not a Member of the IWGA and feature on the programme of the next edition of The World Games or of other sport events that the IWGA organises.

Member federations 
The following international sports federations are members of IWGA.

See also
International Olympic Committee (IOC)
Association of Summer Olympic International Federations (ASOIF)
Association of International Olympic Winter Sports Federations (AIOWF)
Association of IOC Recognised International Sports Federations (ARISF)
Global Association of International Sports Federations (GAISF)
List of international sport federations

References

External links 
 

International
International Olympic Committee
World Games
Organisations based in Lausanne
International sports bodies based in Switzerland